Vakhrushevo is a rural locality (a village) in Nizhne-Vazhskoye Rural Settlement, Verkhovazhsky District, Vologda Oblast, Russia. The population was 31 in 2002.

Geography 
Ivanovskaya is the nearest rural locality.

References 

Rural localities in Verkhovazhsky District